The Caterpillar C280 is a family of diesel internal combustion engines made by Caterpillar. The engine is 18.5 liters per cylinder in displacement. The cylinder size is 11.02 x 11.81 in. bore/stroke. The engine can produce 2400-7600 horsepower at 900 RPM. The peak torque occurs at an engine speed of 800 RPM. The engine weighs over ten tonnes. The Cat C280 is often used in locomotives and freight-class ships.

References 

Caterpillar Inc.